News Hounds is a 1947 film directed by William Beaudine and starring the comedy team of The Bowery Boys.  It is the seventh film in the series.

Plot
Slip is a copy boy for a newspaper, but dreams of having his own byline. Sach is an aspiring photographer for the same paper. The two of them come across a plot to fix sporting events and go undercover to expose the gangsters. Gabe, who is working for the gangsters, has a story of Slip's published which brings a libel suit against the paper because of lack of evidence. The lawsuit goes to trial, and at the last minute Gabe, who is feeling remorse, retrieves photographs that would back the story and gets them to Slip in time for them to be presented as evidence.

Cast

The Bowery Boys
 Leo Gorcey as Terrance J. Montgomery 'Slip' Mahoney
 Huntz Hall as Horace Debussy 'Sach' Jones
 Bobby Jordan as Bobby
 William Benedict as Whitey
 David Gorcey as Chuck

Remaining cast
 Gabriel Dell as Gabe
 Bernard Gorcey as Louie Dumbrowski
 Tim Ryan as John Burks
 Anthony Caruso as "Dapper Dan" Greco
 Christine McIntyre as Jane Ann Connelly
 Nita Bieber as Mame

Home media
Warner Archives released the film on made-to-order DVD in the United States as part of "The Bowery Boys, Volume One" on November 23, 2012.

References

External links 
 
 
 
 

1947 films
Bowery Boys films
1940s English-language films
Monogram Pictures films
Films directed by William Beaudine
American comedy films
1947 comedy films
American black-and-white films
1940s American films